Avurududa (අවුරුදු දා), is a 1985 Sri Lankan Sinhala language drama film co-directed by Wimal Saman Jayaweera and Nimal Tennakoon and co-produced by Saman Jayaweera, Padmasiri Ranasingha and Sarath Kulathunga for S.S Cine Talents. Music directed by Premasiri Khemadasa.

Avurududa received favorable reviews and won the 1986 Presidential award for the best Screenplay.

Cast
 Malini Fonseka
 Sanath Gunathilake
 Henry Jayasena
 Iranganie Serasinghe
 Somy Rathnayake
 Miyuri Samarasinghe
 Ranjith Mahendra Peiris
 Piyaratne M. Senarath
 T. M. Sangadasa

Technical crew
 Song _ Malani Bulathsinhala
 Art direction by Kithsiri Mevan Jayasena and Chandraguptha Thenuwera
 Makeup and Costumes by Ranjith Mathagaweera
 Assistant directors were Christy Shelton Fernando and Ranjith Liyanarchchige
 Special voice by Hettiarchchi

External links 
 [Awurududa]
Avurududa Sinhala Cinema Database
 
Island paper trubute to Henry Jayasena 

1986 films
1980s Sinhala-language films